Nicolás Parodi (born: 19 November 1970
) is a sailor from Uruguay. who represented his country at the 1992 Summer Olympics in Barcelona, Spain as crew member in the Soling. With Helmsman Ricardo Fabini and fellow crew member Nicolás Parodi they took 16th in the Soling.

References

Living people
1970 births
Sailors at the 1992 Summer Olympics – Soling
Olympic sailors of Uruguay
Uruguayan male sailors (sport)